"The Third Witness" is a 1966 television play broadcast by the Australian Broadcasting Corporation. It was part of Wednesday Theatre.

Plot
The story was built around the military occupation of an uneasy middle east country and a modern version of the Resurrection. Private Gregory is a soldier in an army of occupation who us caught up when local events when a seer who caused a clash is executed and his body vanishes.

Cast
David Turnbull as Private Gregory
Brian James
Frank Rich
Raymond Westwell
Brian Hannnn
David Telford
Alan Tobian

Production
It was shot in Melbourne. Writer Callendar based it on the Gospel of St Luke and the story of Gregory.

Reception
The Age said it was "another of those uninhibited attempts to tell the gospel story in terms of 20th century events and people" like BBC's Golgotha and CBCs's Open Grave adding "by way of comparison the ABC's feature more than held its own."

See also
 List of television plays broadcast on Australian Broadcasting Corporation (1960s)

References

External links
 
 

1966 television plays
1966 Australian television episodes
1960s Australian television plays
Black-and-white television episodes
Wednesday Theatre (season 2) episodes